The Loon's Necklace is a Canadian film, directed by F. R. Crawley and released in 1948. The film recounts the Tsimshian legend of how the loon received the distinctive band of white markings on its neck, by granting the gift of restored sight to a blind Tsimshian medicine man and being given a traditional Tsimshian necklace in return.

The film is based on a folk tale known all across Alaska, Northern Canada, and Greenland, The Blind Man and the Loon. The variant of the tale used by Crawley was recorded during the early 1930s in British Columbia by Douglas Leechman of the National Museum of Canada.

The film is narrated by George Gorman, and performed by actors in traditional West Coast First Nations masks in front of a backdrop of brightly coloured oil paintings. The film has sometimes been erroneously credited to the National Film Board of Canada, but was in fact produced by Crawley's own independent studio Crawley Films after being rejected by the NFB.

Production
The film had a budget between $7,000 and $10,000. It was sold to Imperial Oil for $5,000 and the company commissioner Crawley to make Newfoundland Scene due to the success of The Loon's Necklace.

Reception
Arthur Crawley considered the film a financial failure as they failed to sell it to the National Film Board of Canada, but the film later earned $1.5 million over the course of thirty years. The film won the inaugural Canadian Film Award for Film of the Year at the 1st Canadian Film Awards in 1949.

References

Works cited

External links

Watch The Loon's Necklace at the American Indian Film Gallery, University of Arizona

1948 films
Canadian drama short films
First Nations films
Best Picture Genie and Canadian Screen Award winners
Canadian historical films
1948 historical films
1940s Canadian films